Oon Jin Teik (born 27 March 1963) is a Singaporean breaststroke and freestyle swimmer. He competed in three events at the 1984 Summer Olympics. His younger brother, Oon Jin Gee, also competed at the Olympics.

References

External links
 
 

1963 births
Living people
Singaporean male breaststroke swimmers
Singaporean male freestyle swimmers
Olympic swimmers of Singapore
Swimmers at the 1984 Summer Olympics
Commonwealth Games competitors for Singapore
Swimmers at the 1986 Commonwealth Games
Place of birth missing (living people)
Asian Games medalists in swimming
Asian Games bronze medalists for Singapore
Swimmers at the 1986 Asian Games
Medalists at the 1986 Asian Games
Southeast Asian Games medalists in swimming
Southeast Asian Games gold medalists for Singapore
Competitors at the 1985 Southeast Asian Games
20th-century Singaporean people